A kestrel is a type of bird.
 Common kestrel, the most common species

Kestrel may also refer to:

Aerospace, aviation, vehicles
 Kestrel (rocket engine)
 Kestrel, the Glasflügel 401 fibreglass glider
 The Slingsby Kestrel, UK version of this glider
 Hawker Siddeley P.1127 "Kestrel", a prototype of the Hawker Siddeley Harrier aircraft
 Miles Kestrel,  a private venture aircraft developed into the Miles Master
 Rolls-Royce Kestrel, a piston engine
 Kestrel, a British Rail HS4000 prototype diesel locomotive
 Riley Kestrel, a badge-engineered version of the BMC ADO16 or Morris 1100 car
 KESTREL, the call sign of UK-based Thomas Cook Airlines
 VH-71 Kestrel helicopter
 Kestrel K-350, a prototype turboprop aircraft
 Kestrel (surveillance system)
 Seedwings Europe Kestrel, an Austrian hang glider design

Boats
 Kestrel (dinghy)
 Kestrel (steam yacht)

Computer software
"Kestrel", an open source web server for ASP.NET Core
"Kestrel", codename for the J2SE 1.3 release of the Java programming language
"Kestrel", codename for Opera web browser version 9.5
 Kestrel Institute, a spin-off company of SRI International

Fiction and entertainment
The Kestrel, a novel by Lloyd Alexander
Kestrel (DC Comics), a comics character, supervillain antagonist of Hawk and Dove
Kestrel (Marvel Comics), a comics character, a test subject of the Weapon X Project
Kestrel, the main character of the web comic Queen of Wands
Kestrel, a character in The Farseer Trilogy by Robin Hobb
The Kestrel, the default unlocked and first playable ship in the roguelike space exploration game FTL: Faster Than Light
Kestrel, a foe in the computer game Rogue
Kestrel, spaceship in the massively-multiplayer online game Eve Online
CVN-30, OFS Kestrel, a ship in the Ace Combat video games 
The Atinoda Kestrel, a spaceship in the Escape Velocity video game trilogy
McDonnell S2B Kestrel, an airplane in the computer game Crimson Skies
Kestrel, a playable character in the computer game Tom Clancy's Splinter Cell: Conviction
Kestrel, a collection of modular armor pieces in the video game Mass Effect 2
Kestrel, a playable character and an archer in the video game Vainglory
Kestrel, a group of female human-vampire assassins descended from birds in the video game BloodRayne 2
Kestrel, a song by the band Scale the Summit from their album V

Other
Kestrel coal mine, a coal mine operated by Rio Tinto Coal Australia
Kestrel (rocket launcher), a Taiwanese anti-tank weapon
Kestrel USA, an American bicycle manufacturer
The Melbourne Kestrels, an Australian netball team
Viking Kestrel, a children's book imprint